Mohamed Toure (born 26 March 2004) is a professional footballer who plays as a forward for Championnat National 2 side Reims B. Toure was born in a refugee camp in Guinea to Liberian parents fleeing the Second Liberian Civil War. He was raised in Australia.

Club career

Adelaide United
On 14 February 2020, Toure became the youngest ever goal scorer in the A-League at the age of 15 years and 326 days, scoring for Adelaide United in the 84th minute against Central Coast Mariners in a 2–0 win.

In the next A-League season, Mohamed continued his run of scoring at a young age with goals in 5–3 defeat to Perth Glory and a winning goal in an Original Rivalry clash, he became the youngest person to ever score in the rivalry.

Career statistics

Personal life
Toure was born in a refugee camp in Guinea to Liberian parents displaced by the Second Liberian Civil War. He migrated to Australia at five years old. He has an older brother, Al Hassan, and a younger brother, Musa, both of whom are footballers.

References

External links

2004 births
Living people
Sportspeople from Conakry
Australian soccer players
Liberian emigrants to Australia
Naturalised soccer players of Australia
Australian people of Liberian descent
Sportspeople of Liberian descent
Association football forwards
Croydon Kings players
Adelaide United FC players
A-League Men players
Liberian footballers